is a Japanese mathematician working in mathematical physics and is a professor of mathematics at Rikkyo University. He is a grandson of the linguist .

Career
After graduating from the University of Tokyo in 1974, he studied under Mikio Sato at the Research Institute for Mathematical Sciences in Kyoto University. He has made important contributions to mathematical physics, including (independently of Vladimir Drinfeld) the initial development of the study of quantum groups, the development of the theory of -functions for the KP
(Kadomtsev–Petviashvili) integrable hierarchy, and other related integrable hierarchies
, and development of the theory of isomonodromic deformation systems for rational covariant derivative operators.

Awards
In 1993 he won the Japan Academy Prize for this work. In 2010 he received the Wigner Medal.

Selected books
 with Tetsuji Miwa, Etsurō Date: Solitons – differential equations, symmetries and infinite dimensional algebras. Cambridge University Press 2000, 
 with Tetsuji Miwa: Algebraic analysis of solvable lattice models. American Mathematical Society 1993, 
 Editor: Yang-Baxter Equation in integrable systems. World Scientific 1990,

References

1951 births
Living people
20th-century Japanese mathematicians
21st-century Japanese mathematicians
Academic staff of the University of Tokyo
Academic staff of Kyoto University
University of Tokyo alumni
Kyoto University alumni
Mathematical physicists